Dawn Elizabeth Airey (born 15 November 1960) is a British media executive, sports administrator and independent company director.

She chairs the Barclays FA Women's Super League and Championship board, the National Youth Theatre and the educational platform Digital Theatre+. Airey is a non-executive director of Channel 4, Getty Images, Grosvenor Estates and Blackbird.

She is best known for her tenure between 1996 and 2002 at Channel 5, initially as the inaugural Director of Programmes, then Chief Executive, and has held senior roles at ITV plc, Sky UK, Yahoo! and Getty Images.

Early life
Airey was born in Preston, Lancashire. She was educated at Girton College, Cambridge, where she studied geography.

Career
Airey joined Central Independent Television in 1985 as a management trainee under the wing of then director of programmes, Andy Allen. Promotion followed. In 1989 she became Director of Programme Planning at Central and was appointed to the Central broadcasting board. When the ITV Network Centre was established in 1993, she moved to London to become the first Controller of Children's and Daytime Programmes.

In 1994, she became Controller of Arts and Entertainment at Channel 4, chaired by Michael Grade. It was reported in The Sunday Times that her forthright manner had earned her the soubriquet "Scary Airey" and "Zulu Dawn".

Airey joined Channel 5 in 1996, the year before its launch, as its first director of programmes. It was during her tenure that she agreed with an interviewer that some might think the channel's core strengths were "films, football and fucking" but added it was about a lot more. She was subsequently appointed as chief executive of the channel in 2000.

In 2002, it was reported ITV plc was hoping to recruit Airey as its chief executive. However she surprised the television industry by instead accepting a position at the satellite broadcaster, BSkyB. There she was responsible for running all Sky channels, except Sky Sports, and she was in charge of programming and advertising sales. In 2006, she became managing director of Channels and Services whereupon she gained additional responsibility for all third party channels, joint ventures and networked media.

Airey left BSkyB to head up an independent production business backed by private investors however she was only with the company for a total of eight days before it was announced that the venture did not have sufficient cash to continue trading. Soon after, in May 2007, she was reunited with Michael Grade, joining ITV plc as Director of Global Content, running the broadcaster's production and global sales division. But the reunion did not last long.

In May 2008, after eight months at ITV plc, Airey earned Grade's enmity when she resigned to rejoin Channel 5 as chairman and CEO, with a remit to increase profitability and audience share. This she did. RTL's decision in 2010 to exit UK broadcasting and sell the company to Richard Desmond's Northern & Shell saw her elevated to the role of President of RTL-owned CLT-UFA. On 11 August 2010, it was announced Airey would leave Channel 5 to take up a senior post with RTL, its former owners, later in 2010. She left RTL in April 2013.

In August 2013, she joined Yahoo! as senior vice-president of Yahoo EMEA (Europe, the Middle East and Africa). She was in the post until September 2015.

Airey was chief executive officer (CEO) of Getty Images photo agency from October 2015 to 31 December 2018, at which time she became a non-executive director member of its board.

Football
In 2019, The Football Association appointed Airey as chair of the new joint Barclays FA Women's Super League and Championship board.

The 12-strong board, including six women, was established by the FA as part of its commitment to growing the women's game.

It was during Airey's tenure that the FA agreed a landmark three-year broadcast deal with the BBC and Sky that delivered more access to live women's football than ever 
before.

In 2021, she also served as a member of the Government's Expert Panel for a Fan-Led Review of Football Governance, led by the former Sports Minister Tracey Crouch.
The review called for the creation of an independent regulator for the game, alongside greater powers for supporters and an improved "owners and director's test" for those seeking to control local clubs.

Directorships
Airey chairs the joint Barclays FA Women's Super League and Championship board (2019-) and the boards of the National Youth Theatre (2011-) 
and the educational platform Digital Theatre+ (2019-).

She is a non-Executive Director of Channel 4 (2021-), cloud video platform Blackbird (software) (2019-), Grosvenor Estates (2019-) and Getty Images (2015-).

Previously she has held positions on the boards of UK Film Council, the British Library, easyJet, Thomas Cook and LoveFilm.

Honours
In 2017, Airey was News International's visiting professor of Media Studies at Brasenose College, Oxford University and in 2018 was given an Honorary Doctorate of Arts by Edge Hill University for her outstanding contributions to the media industry. She holds a degree from the University of Cambridge.

She is a Fellow and a Vice President of the Royal Television Society and a Fellow of the Royal Society of Arts.

Personal life
She lives with her civil partner Jacqueline Lawrence (Founder and Chair of The Elma Trust, a non-profit organisation) in West London and Oxford. The couple have two daughters.

In 2002, The Guardian featured Airey amongst other "notable republicans" in an article coinciding with Queen Elizabeth II's golden jubilee. Airey said, "I have nothing against the royals per se, I think they're a very good source of inward investment and they fill lots of columns in magazines and tabloids, which I like to read. But I do find it totally anachronistic and mildly insulting that we have a head of state in the 21st century who has constitutional powers but was not voted in and has no accountability to the populace." She added, "If we can get rid of hereditary peers, I think the royal family is next."

References

External links
 Her articles at the Guardian

1960 births
Living people
Alumni of Girton College, Cambridge
British women chief executives
English television executives
Women television executives
Channel 5 (British TV channel)
People educated at Kelly College
Mass media people from Preston, Lancashire
English LGBT businesspeople
National Youth Theatre members
21st-century English LGBT people
British republicans